Frances Cuka (21 August 193616 February 2020) was an English actress, principally on television, whose career spanned over sixty years. In her later years, she was best known for playing Grandma in the sitcom Friday Night Dinner from 2011 to 2018.

Early life and career
Cuka (pronounced Chewka) was born in London, England, the only child of Letitia Alice Annie (née Francis), a tailor, and Joseph Cuka, a process engraver. The family subsequently moved to Hove. As a child, she appeared in BBC radio broadcasts as part of Children's Hour. She trained at the Guildhall School of Music and Drama.

Theatre roles
After the Guildhall, she joined Theatre Workshop; there she performed in Macbeth and then in 1958 created the role of Jo in Shelagh Delaney's play A Taste of Honey, continuing in the role when the play moved to the West End and Broadway. Between runs of A Taste of Honey she appeared in several plays at the Royal Court Theatre, including Endgame and Live Like Pigs. In 1963 she played Becky Sharp in the musical Vanity Fair, alongside George Baker and Dame Sybil Thorndike.

Television
Cuka then moved into television. Her subsequent television roles included the 1971 BBC miniseries adaption of Jane Austen's Sense and Sensibility, Adam Adamant Lives, Hammer House of Horror (the episode "Charlie Boy"), The Champions and Minder. She also appeared as Doll Tearsheet in a BBC TV version of Henry IV, Part II. She had recurring roles in the soap operas Crossroads and Coronation Street. Her film roles have included Scrooge (1970) as Bob Cratchit's wife, and Henry VIII and his Six Wives (1972) as Catherine of Aragon.

Cuka was cast as Peggy Mitchell in the BBC1 soap opera EastEnders when the character was first introduced in 1991. She had filmed several scenes of the character but they were scrapped; Jo Warne was then cast in the role.

From 2006 to 2009, she played the recurring role of a homeless woman called Mrs Bassey in the popular medical drama Casualty. Her final appearance was in September 2009, when her character died from severe burns after being involved in an explosion at a shopping centre.

In 2010, she played Lady Bracknell for Logos Theatre Company at Upstairs at the Gatehouse, in the unusual four-act version of The Importance of Being Earnest.

From March 2011, she appeared in the Channel 4 sitcom Friday Night Dinner, as Grandma Nelly Buller. She had to leave the show in 2018 due to illness, making a final cameo contribution in the series 5 episode "The Violin" (as a voice on the telephone).

Death
Cuka died after suffering a stroke at her home in Hampstead, London on 16 February 2020, aged 83.

Filmography

References

External links

Biography

1936 births
2020 deaths
Alumni of the Guildhall School of Music and Drama
English film actresses
English stage actresses
English television actresses
Actresses from London